Live After Deaf is a live box set by American alt-country singer-songwriter Ryan Adams, released on June 18, 2012 on PAX AM. Comprising fifteen vinyl discs, the release chronicles Adams' return to live performances following a two-year hiatus from music. Live After Deaf is a limited edition release.

Background and recording
Live After Deaf'''s performances are taken from Adams' June 2011, "Acoustic Nightmare" tour. These shows were Adams' first live performances since disbanding his band The Cardinals and retiring from music in 2009. Following the tour's completion, Adams noted, "[It] was the most fun I’ve had ever. I couldn't have imagined it being any better than it was. [...] I just felt really connected and it seemed to me that the people that I was playing for also felt really connected, and it was nice that there wasn’t anything getting in the way of the music."

During the tour, Adams debuted tracks which would subsequently appear on Ashes & Fire (2011).

Title
The album's title is a play-on-words of Iron Maiden's live album Live After Death, and refers to Ryan Adams' struggles with Ménière's disease, which ultimately led him to take an extended respite from live performances in early 2009.

ReleaseLive After Deaf'' was originally scheduled for release on June 15, 2012 on Adams' own website. The site, however, crashed and the release was postponed until June 18.

Track listing
Note: The bonus tracks are inserted according to the order of the setlist at the actual concert. Some bonus tracks are available on all digital versions, but others are only available with the digital download that accompanied the original vinyl box set.

References

2012 live albums
Ryan Adams albums
PAX AM albums